Colin Maskill (born 15 March 1964) is an English former professional rugby league footballer who played in the 1980s and 1990s, and coached in the 1990s and 2000s. He played at club level for Wakefield Trinity (Heritage № 900), Leeds (Heritage № 1149), Doncaster/Doncaster Dragons (Heritage № 692) (two spells), Castleford (Heritage № 722) and Featherstone Rovers (Heritage № 744), as a goal-kicking , i.e. number 9, and coached at club level for Doncaster Dragons and Castleford (assistant coach).

Background
Colin Maskill's birth was registered in Wakefield, West Riding of Yorkshire, England.

Playing career

County Cup Final appearances
Colin Maskill played  in Leeds' 33-12 victory over Castleford in the 1988 Yorkshire County Cup Final during the 1988–89 season at Elland Road, Leeds on Sunday 16 October 1988.

John Player Special Trophy Final appearances
Colin Maskill played  in Leeds' 14-15 defeat by St. Helens in the 1987–88 John Player Special Trophy Final during the 1987–88 season at Central Park, Wigan on Saturday 9 January 1988.

Club career
Colin Maskill made his début for Wakefield Trinity during February 1982, he played his last match for Wakefield Trinity during the 1984–85 season, he made his début for Featherstone Rovers during the 1996 season, and he played his last match for Featherstone Rovers on Sunday 21 July 1996.

Genealogical information
Colin Maskill is the father of the rugby league  for Wakefield Trinity Wildcats, Leeton Galloping Greens (in Leeton, New South Wales, Australia), Queanbeyan Kangaroos of the Canberra Rugby League (in Queanbeyan, New South Wales, Australia), and Featherstone Rovers; Danny "Dan" Maskill (born ).

References

External links
Tigers sign new academy coaches
Rovers trialist Maskill set to face Castleford in Boxing Day match
 (archived by web.archive.org) Maskill joins Castleford backroom staff

1964 births
Living people
Castleford Tigers players
Doncaster R.L.F.C. coaches
Doncaster R.L.F.C. players
English rugby league coaches
English rugby league players
Featherstone Rovers players
Leeds Rhinos players
Rugby league hookers
Rugby league players from Wakefield
Wakefield Trinity players